Justice Ijaz Ahmed Chaudhry is a former justice in the Supreme Court of Pakistan and a former Chief Justice  of Lahore High Court. Before elevation to the judge of Lahore High Court, he was serving as Additional Advocate General Punjab to represent the Government of Punjab, Pakistan. Earlier he remained Assistant Advocate General Punjab from 1988 to 1995.

Early life

Ijaz Ahmed Chaudhry is the son of Chaudhry Abdul Aziz and was born in village Jabbal, Tehsil Shakargarh, District Narowal on 12 December 1950. After doing Bachelor of Laws, Justice Ijaz Ahmad Chaudhry started practicing law in 1975 and was enrolled as an Advocate High Court in 1977. He ascended to be an Advocate Supreme Court in 1992.

Professional career
Ijaz Ahmed Chaudhry served as:

 Special Prosecutor, Sessions Court, Lahore (from 1977 to 1979)
 Legal Advisor NDFC, various Banks and Companies (1988)
 Assistant Advocate General Punjab  (from 1988 to 1995)
 Additional Advocate General, Punjab (from 1999 to May 2001)

He was raised to the Bench at Lahore High Court on 2 May 2001. His responsibilities have included:
 Inspection Judge, Lahore District
 Member Administration Committee, Lahore High Court, Lahore
 Cooperative Judge, Lahore High Court, Lahore
 Appellate Judge, Customs
 Administrative Judge, Anti Terrorism Courts in Punjab
 Administrative Judge, Anti Corruption Courts in Punjab
 Administrative Judge, Drug Courts in Punjab
 Led a delegation of the Judicial Officers to Vienna and Germany in November 2009 on a study tour on International Cooperative in Terrorism Cases/Drugs and Crimes arranged by the United Nations Office
 Chairman, Committee for Enrollment of Advocates Supreme Court of Pakistan
 Member Syndicate, University of the Punjab
 Member Syndicate Committee, Punjab University Law College
 Member Board of Management, Punjab Judicial Academy
 Chairman Board of Management, Punjab Judicial Academy
 Member Board of Governors, Federal Judicial Academy

Some of the landmark judgments delivered by him as Judge of the Lahore High Court are (1) Mukhtaran Mai’s case, (2) Namoos-e-Risalat case, (3) Dr. Abdul Qadeer Khan’s case and (4) Hafiz Saeed Ahmad’s case.
He came to worldwide media attention in May 2010 when he ordered that Facebook be blocked in Pakistan, and then restored access after a page with caricatures of the Prophet Muhammad was removed.

Having served as Judge of the Lahore High Court for more than 9 years, Hon’ble Mr. Justice Ijaz Ahmed Chaudhry was appointed Chief Justice of Lahore High Court on 9 December 2010, and elevated as Judge of the Supreme Court on 17 November 2011. He was among the leading characters of the historic movement for restoration of Judiciary who refused to take oath under the PCO.

He retired from the Supreme Court on 14 December 2015.

References

1950 births
Living people
Justices of the Supreme Court of Pakistan
Chief Justices of the Lahore High Court